Manish Saini is an Indian filmmaker who works in Gujarati language films. He is known for his work as a director in the 2017 film Dhh for which he received a National Film Award at the 65th National Film Awards. The film is a story of three school children who come to believe that a magician, who just came to city, can magically get them out of their troubles. The film that starred Naseeruddin Shah was released by Viacom18 and was also a part of the Toronto International Film Festival Kids.

Career 
Manish is born in Haryana but studied in Ahmedabad, Gujarat. He went to National Institute of Design, Ahmedabad. After Manish completed his study he started working on a script and went around convincing producers to fund his project. After facing a lot of rejections, he decided to produce his own directed film, Dhh by borrowing money from his relatives and friends. In 2018, the film got a National Award for the Best Gujarati Film. His second film, Gandhi & Co, won the Best Children Film at International Gujarati Film Festival (IGFF) 2022 and selected to screen in the Czech Republic.

Filmography

References 

Living people
Indian filmmakers
Year of birth missing (living people)